Dwarka railway station is a small railway station in Devbhumi Dwarka district, Gujarat. Its code is DWK. It serves Dwarka city. The station has two platforms.

Dwarka lies on the Jamnagar–Okha metre-gauge line which was opened for traffic in 1922 by Jamnagar & Dwarka Railway. Later Jamnagar & Dwarka Railway was merged into Saurashtra Railway in April 1948. Later it was undertaken by Western Railway. Gauge conversion of the Hapa–Okha section was later completed in 1984 by Indian Railways.

Major trains 
Following Express/Superfast trains halt at Dwarka railway station in both direction:

 15635/36 Dwarka Express
 15045/46 Gorakhpur–Okha Express
 19567/68 Okha–Tuticorin Vivek Express
 16337/38 Ernakulam–Okha Express
 19251/52 Somnath–Okha Express
 22969/70 Okha–Varanasi Superfast Express
 22905/06 Okha–Howrah Link Express
 16733/34 Rameswaram–Okha Express
 19575/76 Okha–Nathdwara Express
 18401/02 Puri–Okha Dwarka Express
 19565/66 Uttaranchal Express
 19573/74 Okha–Jaipur Weekly Express
 22945/46 Saurashtra Mail

References

Railway stations in Devbhoomi Dwarka district
Rajkot railway division
Railway stations opened in 1922
Dwarka